Dipsas bothropoides is a non-venomous snake found in Brazil.

References

Dipsas
Snakes of South America
Reptiles of Brazil
Endemic fauna of Brazil
Reptiles described in 2020